FCJ may refer to:

 fcj, a Musical Artist
 Faithful Companions of Jesus
 FC Jyväskylä Blackbird, a Finnish football club
 Formula Challenge Japan, a Japanese racing series